This is a list of the German Media Control Top100 Singles Chart number-ones of 1998.

Number-one hits by week

See also 
 List of number-one hits (Germany)
 List of German airplay number-one songs

Notes

References

External links 
 charts.de
 germancharts.com

Number-one hits
Germany
1998
1998